Lisa Raymond and Rennae Stubbs were the defending champions but lost in the first round to Katrina Adams and Debbie Graham.

Alexandra Fusai and Nathalie Tauziat won in the final 6–3, 6–2 against Lindsay Davenport and Monica Seles.

Seeds
Champion seeds are indicated in bold text while text in italics indicates the round in which those seeds were eliminated.

 Manon Bollegraf /  Mary Joe Fernández (quarterfinals)
 Yayuk Basuki /  Caroline Vis (semifinals)
 Lisa Raymond /  Rennae Stubbs (first round)
 Alexandra Fusai /  Nathalie Tauziat (champions)

Draw

External links
 1997 Ameritech Cup Doubles Draw

Ameritech Cup
1997 WTA Tour